Frank R. Galgano (May 14, 1887 – October 24, 1942) was an American lawyer and politician from New York.

Life 
Galgano was born on May 14, 1887 in New York City, New York. He was born and raised on the Lower East Side Fourth Ward, where future Governor Al Smith lived for many years.

Galgano attended DeWitt Clinton High School and the New York Law School. He initially worked as a law clerk in the office of former Lieutenant Governor Lewis Stuyvesant Chanler. He later became a member of the law firm Kramer, Bourke & Galgano, with offices at 220 Broadway.

In 1920, Galgano was elected to the New York State Assembly as a Democrat, representing the New York County 2nd District. He served in the Assembly in 1921, 1922, 1923, 1924, 1925, 1926, 1927, 1928, and 1929. At one point, he was the acting majority leader of the Assembly.

Galgano's wife was Louise, and their daughter was Viola.

Galgano died at his home in Long Beach on October 24, 1942. He was buried in Calvary Cemetery.

References

External links 

 The Political Graveyard

1887 births
1942 deaths
Lawyers from New York City
Politicians from Manhattan
People from the Lower East Side
DeWitt Clinton High School alumni
New York Law School alumni
20th-century American lawyers
20th-century American politicians
Democratic Party members of the New York State Assembly
People from Long Beach, New York
Burials at Calvary Cemetery (Queens)